SS William Johnson was a Liberty ship built in the United States during World War II. She was named after William Johnson, a state legislator and judge in South Carolina, and an associate justice of the United States Supreme Court from 1804 to his death in 1834.

Construction
William Johnson was laid down on 18 March 1942, under a Maritime Commission (MARCOM) contract, MCE hull 38, by the Bethlehem-Fairfield Shipyard, Baltimore, Maryland; sponsored by Miss Irene Long, the secretary to Vice Admiral Howard L. Vickery, and was launched on 22 May 1942.

History
She was allocated to A.H. Bull & Co., Inc., on 16 June 1942. On 15 October 1948, she was laid up in the Hudson River Reserve Fleet, Jones Point, New York. On 27 July 1949, she was laid up in the National Defense Reserve Fleet, Mobile, Alabama. She was sold for scrapping on 8 May 1961, to Union Minerals & Alloys Corp.

References

Bibliography

 
 
 
 

 

Liberty ships
Ships built in Baltimore
1942 ships
Hudson River Reserve Fleet
Mobile Reserve Fleet